Jonathan Waldman is an American journalist, and non-fiction writer.

Life
He grew up in Washington, D.C., and graduated from Dartmouth College, and Boston University.
He was Scripps Fellow in environmental journalism at the University of Colorado, and his 2015 book Rust: The Longest War  was a finalist for the Los Angeles Times Book Prize, and won the 2016 Colorado Book Award in the "general non-fiction" category.

Works

References

External links
 Book Discussion on Rust: The Longest War, C-SPAN
 Slate article
 The Atlantic article

American science journalists
Dartmouth College alumni
Boston University alumni
Living people
Year of birth missing (living people)